Castles and Fortresses of Western Ukraine is a book written in 1997 by the Lviv historian , who spent more than 30 years studying the castles and fortresses of Ukraine. He aimed to make a complete record of all of Ukraine's ancient castles, and recorded more than 5000 objects. He worked to identify archives and other printed sources, and collected plans, photographs, and drawings, as well as reconstructions of monuments.

Matsyuk intended the book is to serve as a historical guide for tourists, and collectors. Information is arranged in accordance with the proposed seven bus routes covering the Ivano-Frankivsk, Ternopil, and Lviv regions, and other small areas near Dubno, Ostroh, Kamenetz-Podolsk, and Khotyn. Monasteries, castles, churches, cathedrals and our ancient monuments are described.

The 199-page-long book is illustrated with hundreds of black-and-white photographs, usually of destroyed buildings, as well as images of reconstructed monuments. A bibliography, and name and geographical indexes are included at the end of the book.

References

Architecture books
Castles in Ukraine